Feats Don't Fail Me Now is the fourth studio album by the American rock band Little Feat, released in 1974, on the Warner Bros. label. The cover was designed by Neon Park.

According to Richie Hayward, "Wait Till the Shit Hits the Fan" dates back to their debut but the band had had trouble recording it on the previous two albums, due to its irregular  meter. It was scrapped until the sessions for this album when it was recorded live in the studio as "The Fan"; the original version appeared on the 2000 boxed set Hotcakes & Outtakes: 30 Years Of Little Feat.

In 2000 the album was voted number 718 in Colin Larkin's All Time Top 1000 Albums.

Track listing

Side One
"Rock & Roll Doctor" (Lowell George, Martin Kibbee) – 2:57 (lead vocal George)
"Oh Atlanta" (Bill Payne) – 3:26 (lead vocal Payne)
"Skin it Back" (Paul Barrère) – 4:11 (lead vocal Barrère)
"Down the Road" (George) – 3:46 (lead vocal George)
"Spanish Moon" (George) – 3:01 (lead vocal George)

Side Two
"Feats Don't Fail Me Now" (Barrère, George, Martin Kibbee) – 2:27 (lead vocal George)
"The Fan" (George, Payne) – 4:30 (lead vocal George)
"Medley: Cold Cold Cold/Tripe Face Boogie" (George/Richie Hayward, Payne) – 10:00 (lead vocal George)

Charts

Personnel

Little Feat
Paul Barrere – guitar, vocals
Sam Clayton – percussion, vocals
Lowell George – vocals, guitar
Kenny Gradney – bass
Richie Hayward – drums, vocals
Bill Payne – keyboards, vocals

Additional
Gordon DeWitty – clavinet ("Spanish Moon")
Fred White – drums ("Spanish Moon")
Emmylou Harris – backing vocals
Bonnie Raitt – backing vocals
Fran Tate – backing vocals
Tower of Power – horns

Notes

External links 
 Feats Don't Fail Me Now album review at Rolling Stone
 – provided by Warner Music Group
 – provided by Warner Music Group

1974 albums
Little Feat albums
Warner Records albums
Albums produced by Van Dyke Parks
Albums produced by Lowell George
Albums with cover art by Neon Park
Albums recorded at Sunset Sound Recorders